Georg Klein (born ) is a former German male volleyball player. He was part of the Germany men's national volleyball team. On club level he played for SWD powervolleys Düren.

References

External links
 profile at FIVB.org

1991 births
Living people
German men's volleyball players
Place of birth missing (living people)
21st-century German people